Tarn Crag, may refer to a number of hills in the English Lake District:

Tarn Crag (Easedale), near Grasmere
Tarn Crag (Far Eastern Fells), near Longsleddale